Gösta von Hennigs (15 April 1866 – 26 December 1941) was a Swedish painter. His work was part of the painting event in the art competition at the 1932 Summer Olympics.

Works

References

1866 births
1941 deaths
20th-century Swedish painters
Swedish male painters
Olympic competitors in art competitions
People from Vadstena Municipality
20th-century Swedish male artists